Good News is a 1947 Metro-Goldwyn-Mayer musical film based on the 1927 stage production of the same name. It starred June Allyson, Peter Lawford, Mel Tormé, and Joan McCracken. The screenplay by Betty Comden and Adolph Green was directed by Charles Walters in Technicolor.

Three additional songs were written for the film: "The French Lesson", "Pass That Peace Pipe", and "An Easier Way", the last of which was cut from the released film.

Good News was the second adaptation of the stage musical, after the 1930 film Good News. The 1947 film was a more sanitized version of the musical; the 1930 version included Pre-Code content, such as sexual innuendo and lewd suggestive humor.

Production
The Film was originally planned for Mickey Rooney and Judy Garland as a follow up to their success in "Babes in Arms".

Good News  and Summer Stock was also originally planned to become part of the backyard musical series. Summer Stock was released three years later.

Plot
The film is set in 1927 at fictional Tait College, where football is all the rage ("Tait Song"/"Good News").

Tait's football star Tommy Marlowe (Peter Lawford) is a prime catch for the college girls. Tommy tells his friend and non-playing teammate Bobby Turner (McDonald) that the trick to attracting girls is to show no interest ("Be a Ladies' Man").

New student Pat McClellan (Marshall) resists his advances, cutting Tommy down to size at a party ("Lucky in Love"). Pat insults Tommy in French, so Tommy enlists part-time school librarian Connie Lane (June Allyson) to help him study the language ("The French Lesson"). He gradually falls for Connie, who comes from a poor background, which does not bother her ("The Best Things in Life are Free"). Meanwhile, Babe Doolittle (McCracken) is seeking to leave a relationship with jealous football player Beef (Tindall) so she can get involved with Bobby Turner.

At a local soda shop, Babe advises Pat not to lose her temper ("Pass the Peace Pipe"). Tommy's newly learned French fails to impress Pat and he leaves dejectedly. Babe, concerned that Tommy's frame of mind will cause him to lose the big game, revives Pat's interest by (untruthfully) telling her Tommy comes from a wealthy family. Connie grows attracted to Tommy. Tommy asks Connie to the prom, but reneges when Pat shows interest. Connie is heartbroken ("Just Imagine"). Tommy is failing French and begs for help from a reluctant Connie - he belatedly realizes his true feelings for her although Pat has pressured him into proposing.

In the end, Tait wins the big game, Tommy pairs off with Connie, Beef pairs off with Pat, and Babe pairs off with Bobby Turner. The college bursts out into song in a production number ("Varsity Drag").

Cast

 June Allyson as Connie Lane
 Peter Lawford as Tommy Marlowe
 Patricia Marshall as Pat McClellan
 Joan McCracken as Babe Doolittle
 Ray McDonald as Bobby Turner
 Mel Tormé as Danny
 Robert Strickland as Peter Van Dyne III 
 Donald MacBride as Coach Johnson
 Tom Dugan as Pooch
 Clinton Sundberg as Professor Burton Kennyon
 Loren Tindall as Beef
 Connie Gilchrist as Cora the cook
 Morris Ankrum as Dean Griswold
 Georgia Lee as Flo
 Jane Green as Mrs. Drexel

Soundtrack

 "Good News"
 Music by Ray Henderson
 Lyrics by Lew Brown and Buddy G. DeSylva
 Sung by Joan McCracken and chorus
 "Tait Song"
 Music by Ray Henderson
 Lyrics by Lew Brown and Buddy G. DeSylva
 Performed by Joan McCracken and chorus
 "Be a Ladies' Man"
 Music by Ray Henderson
 Lyrics by Lew Brown and Buddy G. DeSylva
 Performed by Peter Lawford, Ray McDonald, Mel Tormé,  and Lon Tindal
 "Lucky in Love"
 Music by Ray Henderson
 Lyrics by Lew Brown and Buddy G. DeSylva
 Performed by Patricia Marshall, Joan McCracken, Mel Tormé, June Allyson, and Peter Lawford
 "The French Lesson"
 Written by Roger Edens, Betty Comden, and Adolph Green
 Performed by June Allyson and Peter Lawford
 "The Best Things in Life Are Free"
 Music by Ray Henderson
 Lyrics by Lew Brown and Buddy G. DeSylva
 Performed by June Allyson
 Performed also by Mel Tormé
 "Pass That Peace Pipe"
 Written by Roger Edens, Hugh Martin, and Ralph Blane
 Performed by Joan McCracken, Ray McDonald, and chorus
 "Just Imagine"
 Music by Ray Henderson
 Lyrics by Lew Brown and Buddy G. DeSylva
 Sung by June Allyson
 "Varsity Drag"
 Music by Ray Henderson
 Lyrics by Lew Brown and Buddy G. DeSylva
 Performed by June Allyson, Peter Lawford, and chorus

Deleted song

"An Easier Way", sung by June Allyson and Patricia Marshall, was filmed but cut from the released version. This musical number survives and is included as an "extra" on the DVD.

Reception

Box office
The film was a box office disappointment, earning $2,545,000 in the US and Canada and $411,000 elsewhere, recording a loss of $7,000.

Awards
Edens, Martin and Blane were nominated for the Academy Award for Best Original Song for "Pass That Peace Pipe".

References

External links
 
 
 
 
 DVD information about the 1947 film version

1947 films
1947 musical comedy films
1940s sports comedy films
American football films
American musical comedy films
Films based on musicals
Films directed by Charles Walters
Films produced by Arthur Freed
Films set in 1927
Films set in the Roaring Twenties
Films set in universities and colleges
Films with screenplays by Betty Comden and Adolph Green
Metro-Goldwyn-Mayer films
1940s English-language films
1940s American films